Marcus Willis (born 9 October 1990) is a British professional tennis player. Willis made his tour debut at the 2016 Wimbledon Championships after qualifying for the main draw, where he gained recognition after playing against Roger Federer in the second round on Centre Court.

Willis also plays touchtennis, in which he has a career-high ranking of No. 2 in singles, having won 12 singles and two doubles titles.

Personal life and junior career
Willis began playing tennis at the age of 9. His mother is a learning support assistant and his father is an accountant. Willis attended St Paul's Primary School, Wokingham and The Forest School, Winnersh.  Willis is married to Jennifer Bate, an NHS dental surgeon and former beauty model whom he had met at a concert.

Willis played his first junior match in April 2006 at the age of 15 at a grade 5 tournament in the UK. Throughout his junior career, he reached a high of No. 15 in the combined junior world rankings in September 2008 at posted a win–loss record of 92–36.

Willis was sent home from the 2008 Australian Open by the Lawn Tennis Association (LTA) for his "slack attitude" when he missed the bus to a practice session and eventually arrived without rackets, having left them at his hotel.

Junior Slam results – Singles:

Australian Open: A (—)
French Open: 2R (2008)
Wimbledon: 3R (2007, 2008)
US Open: 2R (2008)

Junior Slam results – Doubles:

Australian Open: A (—)
French Open: 1R (2008)
Wimbledon: 2R (2007)
US Open: 2R (2008)

Professional career

2007–2015
Willis officially turned pro in 2007 at the age of 17. Throughout 2007-2015, he made 14 ITF singles finals and 41 ITF doubles finals (winning 8 singles and 25 doubles). He only made one challenger final, the 2014 Charlottesville Challenger where he made the doubles final partnering Lewis Burton where they lost to top seed Treat Huey and Frederik Nielsen in three sets. He got a wildcard spot into the 2009 Wimbledon Qualifying where he lost in the second round and the 2014 Wimbledon Qualifying where he lost in the first round. He achieved a career-high ranking of 322 on June 16, 2014.

2016: Wimbledon second round
The only success for Willis in the first five months of 2016 was qualifying for the Tunisia Futures F1 in January, and progressing to the quarterfinals, where he won $356. His failure to defend the previous year's points led to his ranking falling to number 772 by the start of Wimbledon.

Willis was considering his retirement in 2016 as he had just torn his hamstring and was offered a tennis teaching job in Philadelphia. His girlfriend, Jennifer Bate, convinced him to keep playing professional tennis and to give it one more try. He trained heavily throughout February to May to play his next event at Wimbledon qualifying.

Willis was awarded a spot into the qualifying draw after countryman David Rice withdrew. He won six matches to qualify for the main draw of the 2016 Wimbledon Championships, which included wins against Daniil Medvedev and Andrey Rublev. In the first round, Willis upset Ričardas Berankis, a player ranked more than 700 places above him, to set up a clash with seven-time champion Roger Federer. Willis was defeated by Federer 6–0, 6–3, 6–4 on Centre Court in the second round, receiving a standing ovation nevertheless. The BBC later held a vote for the best shot made of the tournament, and Willis's lob over Federer earned him the win.

Injury prevented Willis from playing immediately after Wimbledon 2016, but he was given a wild card into qualifying for the Erste Bank Open 500 in Vienna over the weekend of October 22–23. He has also been invited to play Tie Break Tens at the same venue on Sunday 23 October, against Andy Murray, Dominic Thiem and Jo Wilfried Tsonga.

His second tournament after Wimbledon was a Future in Kuwait which he won both the singles and the doubles.

2017: Wimbledon doubles third round 
Willis played few tournaments in the first half of 2017 due to injuries and becoming a father to his first child (a girl) but played in the Great Britain F1, F2 and F3, reaching the second round, semi-finals and finals respectively, winning $2283 overall. He then reached the quarter-finals of the U.S.A. F15 but lost in the first round of the Spain F14. He then failed to qualify for the Challenger in Surbiton and then reached the second round of the Ilkley Challenger, losing to Sam Groth.

At the 2017 Wimbledon Championships, Willis lost in the final round of qualifying to Illya Marchenko in straight sets, although Willis had been hindered by a knee injury he suffered against fellow Brit Liam Broady in the previous round. Since he failed to defend his points from last years Wimbledon his ranking fell below number 500 in the world.

In the Wimbledon doubles, he and partner Jay Clarke had been awarded a wild card for the main draw. In the opening round, they beat Jared Donaldson and Jeevan Nedunchezhiyan after coming back from two sets to love. They caused a big surprise by defeating the defending champions and second seeds Nicolas Mahut and Pierre-Hugues Herbert in the next round, also in a five-setter. Their run ended with a loss to Oliver Marach and Mate Pavić in the third round.

2018–2020: Final years in Singles 
Willis missed Wimbledon in singles after losing to Dan Evans in the pre-qualifying playoffs. His final professional match was in the qualifying event for the 2018 Wimbledon doubles. After Wimbledon, he played for the San Diego Aviators in the 2018 World TeamTennis league, where the team narrowly missed the WTT finals.

He had continued to play doubles tournaments at Futures events since November 2020.

His most recent participation in touchtennis dated back to September 2020, prior to his return in 2022.

2021: Retirement  
In March 2021, Willis announced he was retiring from the sport.

2022–2023: Doubles comeback 
WIllis resumed playing doubles on the ITF tour from August 2022. Since then he has won five ITF 25k tournaments, all with partner Scott Duncan.

Performance timelines

Singles

Doubles

ATP Challenger and ITF Futures/World Tennis Tour finals

Singles: 16 (9–7)

Doubles: 52 (33-22)

Wins over top 10 players

Doubles

Record against top-10 players
Willis' match record against players who have been ranked in the Top 10.

References

External links
 
 

English male tennis players
British male tennis players
Sportspeople from Slough
1990 births
Living people
Tennis people from Berkshire